The following is the 1960–61 network television schedule for the three major English language commercial broadcast networks in the United States. The schedule covers primetime hours from September 1960 through March 1961. The schedule is followed by a list per network of returning series, new series, and series cancelled after the 1959–60 season.

New fall series are highlighted in bold. All times are Eastern and Pacific.

Each of the 30 highest-rated shows is listed with its rank and rating as determined by Nielsen Media Research.

 Yellow indicates the programs in the top 10 for the season.
 Cyan indicates the programs in the top 20 for the season.
 Magenta indicates the programs in the top 30 for the season.

Sunday 

Note: ABC aired the interim The Walter Winchell Show at 10:30 p.m. from early October until early November.

Monday 

Notes: On CBS, Presidential Countdown aired as an interim series, 10:30–11 p.m. in September and October until the November 8th election. In some areas, Douglas Edwards with the News and The Huntley-Brinkley Report aired at 6:45 p.m. Peter Gunn moved from NBC to ABC in the fall of 1960. The episodes of Brenner that ran on CBS in the summer of 1961 consisted of two previously unaired episodes produced in 1959 and reruns of episodes broadcast during the summer of 1959.

Tuesday 
This is the first broadcast of The Bugs Bunny Show.

Wednesday

Thursday 

* formerly You Bet Your Life

Friday

Saturday 

Note: On NBC, The Campaign and the Candidates aired as an interim series, 9:30–10:30 p.m., from mid-September until the November 8 election.

By network

ABC

Returning Series
77 Sunset Strip
The Adventures of Ozzie and Harriet
Adventures in Paradise
Alcoa Presents: One Step Beyond
Bronco
Cheyenne
The Detectives Starring Robert Taylor
The Donna Reed Show
Hawaiian Eye
Lawman
The Lawrence Welk Show
Leave It to Beaver
The Life and Legend of Wyatt Earp
Matty's Funday Funnies
Maverick
Peter Gunn (moved from NBC)
The Real McCoys
The Rebel
The Rifleman
Sugarfoot
Take a Good Look
The Untouchables
Walt Disney Presents

New Series
The Asphalt Jungle *
The Bugs Bunny Show
Expedition!
The Fight of the Week
The Flintstones
Guestward, Ho!
Harrigan and Son
Hong Kong
The Islanders
The Law and Mr. Jones
Make That Spare
My Three Sons
Naked City
The Roaring 20's
Stagecoach West
Sugarfoot
Surfside 6
Winston Churchill: The Valiant Years

Not returning from 1959–60:
The Alaskans
Black Saddle
Bourbon Street Beat
Broken Arrow
Charley Weaver's Hobby Lobby
Colt .45
Dick Clark's Saturday Night Beach-Nut Show
Dick Clark's World of Talent
The Gale Storm Show
The Jeannie Carson Show
John Gunther's High Road
Johnny Staccato
Music for a Spring Night
Music for a Summer Night
Jubilee USA
Keep Talking
The Man from Blackhawk
Man with a Camera
The Pat Boone Chevy Showroom
Philip Marlowe
The Wednesday Night Fights

CBS

Returning Series
The Ann Sothern Show
The Armstrong Circle Theatre
Brenner
Candid Camera
CBS Reports
The Danny Thomas Show
Dennis the Menace
Dick Powell's Zane Grey Theater
Douglas Edwards with the News
The DuPont Show with June Allyson
The Ed Sullivan Show
Face the Nation
Frontier Justice
The Garry Moore Show
General Electric Theatre
Gunsmoke
Have Gun — Will Travel
Hennessy
I've Got a Secret
The Jack Benny Show
Lassie
The Many Loves of Dobie Gillis
Perry Mason
Person to Person
Rawhide
The Red Skelton Show
The Spike Jones Show
To Tell the Truth
The Twentieth Century
The Twilight Zone
The United States Steel Hour
 Wanted: Dead or Alive
What's My Line

New Series
Angel
The Aquanauts
Bringing Up Buddy
Danger Man
Eyewitness to History
Glenn Miller Time
Gunslinger *
Holiday Lodge *
The Jackie Gleason Show
Mr. Garlund
My Sister Eileen
Route 66
Summer Sports Spectacular *The Tom Ewell Show'Way OutThe WitnessNot returning from 1959–60:Be Our Guest
The Betty Hutton Show
The Big Party
Buick-Electra Playhouse
The Dennis O'Keefe Show
Diagnosis: Unknown
Father Knows Best
The George Gobel Show
Hotel de Paree
The Invisible Man
Johnny Ringo
The Kate Smith Show
The Lineup
Lucy in Connecticut
Markham
Masquerade Party
Men into Space
The Millionaire
Mr. Lucky
Peck's Bad Girl
Playhouse 90
The Revlon Revue
The Robert Herridge Theatre
The Texan
Tightrope!

NBCReturning SeriesAlfred Hitchcock Presents (moved from CBS)
The Art Carney Special
Bachelor Father
Bat Masterson
The Bell Telephone Hour
Bonanza
The Chevy Mystery Show
Concentration
The Deputy
The Dinah Shore Chevy Show
Five Star Jubilee
The Ford Show
The Groucho Show
Happy
The Huntley–Brinkley Report
It Could Be You
Jackpot Bowling starring Milton Berle
Laramie
The Lawless Years
The Loretta Young Show
The Man from Interpol
NBC News Specials
One Happy Family
Perry Como's Kraft Music Hall
The Price Is Right
Riverboat
Shirley Temple's Storybook
Tales of Wells Fargo
This Is Your Life
Wagon Train
Westinghouse Playhouse Starring Nanette Fabray and Wendell CoreyNew SeriesAcapulco *The Americans *The Barbara Stanwyck ShowThe Campaign and the Candidates *Dan RavenDanteFive Star Jubilee *Great Ghost TalesThe Groucho ShowHappy *KlondikeMichael ShayneThe Nation's Future *National VelvetOne Happy Family *OutlawsPeter Loves MarySing Along with Mitch *The Tab Hunter ShowTales of Wells Fargo *The Tall ManThrillerWestinghouse Playhouse Starring Nanette Fabray and Wendell Corey*Westinghouse Preview Theatre *Whispering Smith *Not returning from 1959–60:'The Arthur Murray PartyFibber McGee and MollyFive FingersGas Company PlayhouseGillette Cavalcade of SportsLaw of the PlainsmanLove and MarriageM SquadThe Man and the ChallengeMusic on IceNBC PlayhouseNBC Sunday ShowcaseOmnibusOverland TrailPeople Are FunnyRichard Diamond, Private DetectiveStartimeThe Steve Allen Plymouth ShowTateThe TroubleshootersWichita TownWranglerNote: The * indicates that the program was introduced in midseason.

Controversy
Between January and June 1960, the 1960 Writers Guild of America strike took place, affecting the fall schedule. The networks had numerous holes, which were mostly filled with unscripted material, some of which included political programs in anticipation of the forthcoming 1960 United States presidential election. CBS gave the unprecedented step of showing episodes from previous seasons of popular series. Some timeslots however (particularly that of 10:30-11) were ceded to stations.

On May 9, 1961, at the annual convention of the National Association of Broadcasters new Federal Communications Commission chairman Newton Minow delivered "Television and the Public Interest," a scathing speech directed at the "procession of game shows, violence, audience participation shows, formula comedies about totally unbelievable families, blood and thunder, mayhem, violence, sadism, murder, Western badmen, Western goodmen, private eyes, gangsters, more violence, and cartoons, and, endlessly, commercials, many screaming, cajoling, and offending, and, most of all, boredom [...] Is there one network president in this room who claims he can't do better?" Minow called TV a "vast wasteland"; the phrase was picked up by the press and resulted in bad publicity for the networks and for the television industry as a whole. According to television historians Castleman and Podrazik (1982), the networks were in a bind, though: they had already purchased their fall 1961 programs and had locked in their 1961–62 schedules. "The best the networks could do was slot a few more public affairs shows, paint rosy pictures for 1962–63, and prepare to endure the barrage of criticism they felt certain would greet the new season."

References

Additional sources
 Castleman, H. & Podrazik, W. (1982). Watching TV: Four Decades of American Television. New York: McGraw-Hill. 314 pp.
 McNeil, Alex. Total Television. Fourth edition. New York: Penguin Books. .
 Brooks, Tim & Marsh, Earle (2007). The Complete Directory to Prime Time Network and Cable TV Shows'' (9th ed.). New York: Ballantine. .

United States primetime network television schedules
1960 in American television
1961 in American television